Azosemide is a high-ceiling loop diuretic agent that was brought to market in 1981 by Boehringer Mannheim.  As of 2015 it was available as a generic in some Asian countries.

Azosemide has been found as an adulterant in ketamine.

References

Diuretics
Tetrazoles
Sulfonamides
Thiophenes